Russolo is a surname. Notable people with the surname include:

Antonio Russolo (1877–1942), Italian composer, brother of Luigi
Luigi Russolo (1885–1947), Italian painter, composer, builder of experimental musical instruments, and author

Italian-language surnames